Geneseo High School is located in Geneseo, Illinois, United States. The school is part of the Geneseo Community Unit School District 228, which covers Geneseo, Atkinson, and parts of Colona.

Academics
In 2012 Geneseo High School was a U.S. News & World Report Silver Medal winner.  Based on their criteria, Geneseo High School ranked #1427 (out of 22,000) in the US and ranked #52 (out of 672) in the state of Illinois.

History
The high school was originally an old building in the city park, but then moved to the former J. D. Darnall Jr. High School, which was relatively new. The old high school became the Geneseo Junior High School, which closed in 1998 with the opening of a new building, Geneseo Middle School. The high school was known as J. D. Darnall Senior High School until 2005, when it just became Geneseo High School.

Demographics 
The demographic breakdown of the 833 students enrolled in 2013-14 was:
Male - 53.5%
Female - 46.5%
Native American/Alaskan - 0.6%
Asian/Pacific islanders - 0.5%
Black - 0.1%
Hispanic - 4.8%
White - 91.8%
Multiracial - 2.3%

18.4% of the students were eligible for free or reduced lunch.

Athletics and activities
The Geneseo Maple Leafs participate in numerous IHSA  sanctioned sports and activities. The school colors are Kelly green and white. The sports teams compete in the Western Big 6 conference.

The following sports are offered:

Baseball (boys)
Basketball (boys & girls)
Bowling (boys & girls)
Competitive cheer (girls)
Cross country (boys & girls)
Football (boys)
State champion - 1976, 1977, 1978, 1982
Golf (boys & girls)
Gymnastics (girls)
Softball (girls)
Soccer (boys & girls)
Swimming and diving (girls)
Tennis (boys & girls)
Track and field (boys & girls)
Volleyball (girls)
Wrestling (boys)

Geneseo also participates in these non-sport IHSA sanctioned activities:

Bass fishing
Drama
Group interpretation
Speech
Band
Vocal music
Scholastic bowl

The school won the state music sweepstakes title in 1984–85, 1985–86, 1987–88, 1997–98, 1998–99 and 2005–06.

References

External links

Schools in Henry County, Illinois
Public high schools in Illinois